Uraman Takht (also Romanized as Ūrāmān Takht and Ooraman Takht; also known as Avromān, Owrāmān, Owrāmān Shahr, Shehr-i-Avrōman, and Ūrāmān) is a city in Uraman Takht Rural District, Uraman District, Sarvabad County, Kurdistan Province, Iran. At the 2006 census, its population was 2,754, in 644 families. The city is populated by Kurds.

References 

Towns and villages in Sarvabad County
Kurdish settlements in Kurdistan Province